Kanpur Mayoral Constituency is one of the 16 mayoral constituencies of Uttar Pradesh.

Total Number of Voters

List of Mayors

Election Results

References
http://m.timesofindia.com/home/BJPs-Jagatveer-Singh-Dron-won-mayoral-election-in-Kanpur-/articleshow/14736877.cms

http://www.thehindu.com/2000/11/27/stories/14272252.htm

http://m.ndtv.com/agra-news/bjp-shines-in-uttar-pradesh-local-body-polls-congress-fails-491624

http://m.hindustantimes.com/india/neeraj-quits-bjp-to-join-sp/story-mgqjHBlm4Suc8KkWwZ8c5H.html

Government of Kanpur
Politicians from Kanpur